The Beardmore WB.III was a British carrier-based fighter biplane of World War I. It was a development of the Sopwith Pup that Beardmore was then building under licence, but was specially adapted for shipboard use.

Design and development
Compared to the Sopwith Pup on which it was based, the WB.III featured a redesigned wing cellule with no stagger and an extra set of struts inboard, facilitating folding for stowage; a modified fuselage that carried emergency floatation gear; and main undercarriage that could be folded for stowage on the WB.IIIF. Later examples, designated WB.IIID, could jettison their undercarriage for safer water landings.

Performance was inferior that of to the Pup and it was largely superseded by the Sopwith 2F1 Ships Camel.

Operators

Royal Naval Air Service

Specifications

See also

References

Further reading

 
 

1910s British fighter aircraft
Carrier-based aircraft
W.B.III
Aircraft first flown in 1917
Biplanes
Rotary-engined aircraft